Li Shishi (?-?) was a courtesan from Bianjing (now Kaifeng), the capital of the Song Empire. At the time, jiaoji refers to women who engaged in performing arts for a living, and their scope of work included: singing, dancing, reciting poetry and painting during the Northern Song dynasty (960 - 1127). According to Gui Er Ji written by Zhang Duanyi, Emperor Huizong was a regular patron of hers. She fled to Zhejiang or Hunan (recorded in Da Song Xuanhe Yishi) after the Jingkang Incident of the Jin–Song wars occurred in year 1127 AD, as recorded in Mo Man Lu by Zhang Bangji.

Early life
Born Wang Shishi, her mother died soon after her birth. Her father fed her bean starch to keep her alive. Her father, Wang Yin, was worker in a clothing pigment factory in Bianjing. When Li was four, her father was jailed for delaying an Imperial textile order. He later died in prison. Li went at first to an orphanage but was later taken in by a procuress named Li Yun, who owned a brothel. Li Yun changed the  girl's surname to Li. (Her given name, Shishi, has Buddhist connotations. Li was taken to the entertainment district Jinqian Xiang and put to work as a young prostitute.

Courtesan
Li was renown for her beauty and artistic abilities. Amongst her admirers were the renowned poet and bureaucrat Zhou Bangyan and the outlaw Song Jiang. Her frame spread to the Emperor, Huizong, who visited her in disguised as a business man in 1109. Her charm and elegance led him to visit her whenever he could after the meeting. Their relationship became on open secret in Bianjing. Some sources relate that Li Shishi moved into the Emperor's palace and was given the title Lady of Ying State. Other sources say Huizong had a tunnel dug from the palace to Li Shishi's house. Part of the story is told in the classic novel, the Water Margin.

In 1126 Huizong took responsibility for overwhelming losses during the Jin–Song Wars and abdicated in favour of his eldest son Zhao Huan (Emperor Qinzong). Realising she was in a precarious position, Li Shishi donated all the gifts from Huizong to the army who were putting up a valiant defence, and requested the Emperor's permission to become a Daoist nun. In 1127 Bianjing was overrun by the Jin army. Huizong and his court was captured and Huizong later died, ending the Northern Song dynasty. Li is reported to have fled south, although other accounts give that she committed suicide by swallowing a gold hairpin after she was offered to Jin commander.

In fiction
In the classical novel Water Margin, Li Shishi encounters the outlaws from Liangshan Marsh on two occasions; on the second, more important encounter, she befriends Yan Qing and agrees to become her sworn sister. She then promises Yan Qing that she will tell the emperor about the outlaws' plight and desire to be granted amnesty. Water Margin, Chapter 72.

Poems about Li Shishi
Song dynasty poet Chao Chongzhi described Li Shishi's dancing and singing talents as follows:

Watch her dance to "Nichang Yuyi Qu", "Nichang Yuyi Qu" (霓裳羽衣曲; literally: "Song of Colourful Plumage") was a musical piece presented by Yang Jingzhong (楊敬忠), jiedushi of Hexi (河西), during the Tianbao era (713-741) of the reign of Emperor Xuanzong of the Tang dynasty.  listen to her recite / sing "Yushu Houting Hua". "Yushu Houting Hua" (玉樹後庭花; literally: "Jade Trees and Courtyard Flowers") was a poem written by the Chen dynasty's last ruler Chen Shubao (553-604). It was of the gongti (literally: "palace style") genre of Chinese poetry.  (看舞霓裳羽衣曲，聽歌玉樹後庭花)

Southern Song era poet Zhu Dunru (朱敦儒; 1081–1159) wrote:

Performing an interpretation of "Yangguan." "Yangguan" refers to the "Yangguan Qu" (陽關曲; literally: "Song of Yangguan"), which is also known as "Yangguan San Die" (陽關三疊; literally: "Three Overlaps of Yangguan"). It is an ancient Chinese musical piece based on a poem by Tang dynasty poet Wang Wei (699-759). In another tone and style, in the previous dynasty. The "previous dynasty" refers to the Northern Song dynasty. only Madam Li (Li Shishi) was capable of doing that. (解唱《陽關》別調聲，前朝惟有李夫人)

References

Bibliography
 
 
 
 
 
 

Song dynasty people
Chinese courtesans
12th-century Chinese women singers